Maxwell Sam Parker (born 29 October 1953) is a former Australian rules footballer who played for Woodville in the South Australian National Football League (SANFL). He also had stints at Footscray in the Victorian Football League (VFL) and with North Adelaide.

Parker was a ruckman when he arrived at Footscray from Welshpool. As his new club already had established ruckmen in Gary Dempsey and Barry Round, Parker was tried as a key forward. He made five appearances for Footscray in the 1971 VFL season, aged only 17. Against both North Melbourne and South Melbourne he kicked three goals.

Unable to register a senior game in 1972, Parker returned to country football and played briefly at Gippsland club Leongatha.

The rest of his career was spent in the SANFL. Playing mostly as a defender, Parker appeared in 266 games for Woodville over 14 seasons and was club captain in 1982, 1986 and 1987.

He played his final league season with North Adelaide, having left Woodville in acrimonious circumstances. 

A three time South Australian interstate representative, Parker retired with 280 SANFL games and a total of 285 games in elite Australian rules football, and also played a further 21 pre-season/night series matches.

References

1953 births
Australian rules footballers from Victoria (Australia)
Western Bulldogs players
Woodville Football Club players
North Adelaide Football Club players
Leongatha Football Club players
Living people
South Australian State of Origin players